Serine/threonine-protein kinase PCTAIRE-1 is an enzyme that in humans is encoded by the PCTK1 gene.

Function 

The protein encoded by this gene belongs to the cdc2/cdkx subfamily of the ser/thr family of protein kinases. It may play a role in signal transduction cascades in terminally differentiated cells. This gene is thought to escape X inactivation. Two transcript variants encoding the same protein have been found for this gene.

Interactions 

PCTK1 has been shown to interact with CDK5R1.

References

Further reading 

 
 
 
 
 
 
 
 
 
 
 
 
 
 
 

EC 2.7.11